The 13th Pusan International Film Festival took place on October 2 to 10, 2008 in Busan, South Korea. A total of 315 films from 60 countries were screened at the festival. 

The event opened with The Gift to Stalin by Kazakh director Rustem Abdrashev. South Korean Yoon Jong-chan's I Am Happy closed the festival. The event held 827 screenings and was attended by 198,818 people.

Juries

New Currents
Anna Karina, Danish-French actress, Head Juror
Samira Makhmalbaf, Iranian director
Santosh Sivan, Indian director
Lee Hwa-si, South Korean actress
Karl Baumgartner, German film producer

BIFF Mecenat Award
Ahn Jung-sook, former director of Korean Film Council
Jean-Pierre Rehm, head of Marseille Festival of Documentary Film
Zhang Xian-min, Chinese film professor

Sonje Award
Kim-Jho Gwangsoo, Korean film producer
Roger Gonin, French director
Calida Uabumrungjit, Thai project director

NETPAC Award
Mohamed Atebbai, Iranian film critic
Jeannette Paulson Hereniko, former Hawaii International Film Festival director
Edward Delos Santos Cabagnot, programmer of Cinemalaya Philippine Independent Film Festival

FIPRESCI Award
Elise Domenach, French film critic
Hynek Pallas, Swedish film critic
Dubravka Lakić, Serbian film critic
Bitopan Borborah Rinju, Indian film critic
Shin Kang-ho, South Korean film critic

Official selection

Opening and closing films

Gala Presentation

A Window on Asian Cinema

New Currents

Korean Cinema Today

Korean Cinema Retrospective

World Cinema

Awards
New Currents Award: Land of Scarecrows by Roh Gyeong-tae (South Korea/France) and Naked of Defenses by Masahide Ichii (Japan)
Special Mention: Members of the Funeral by Baek Seung-bin (South Korea) and Er Dong by Jin Yang (China)
BIFF Mecenat Award: Mental by Soda Kazuhiro (Japan/United States) and Old Partner by Lee Chung-ryoul (South Korea)
Sonje Award: Andong by Rommel Tolentino (Philippines) and Girl by Hong Sung-hoon (South Korea)
NETPAC Award: Members of the Funeral by Baek Seung-bin (South Korea) and Treeless Mountain by So Yong Kim (United States/South Korea)
FIPRESCI Award: Jalainur by Zhao Ye (China)
KNN Award: 100 by Chris Martinez (Philippines)
The Asian Filmmaker of the Year: Gulnara Sarsenova
Korean Cinema Award: Richard Peña

References

External links

Busan International Film Festival
Busan International Film Festival, 2008
Busan International Film Festival, 2008
Busan International Film Festival, 2008
2008 festivals in South Korea